Kwame Sanaa-Poku Jantuah (21 December 1922 – 3 February 2011), originally known as John Ernest Kwame Antoa Onyina Jantuah, was a Ghanaian politician, lawyer and diplomat. He was the last survivor from the first all-African cabinet set up by Kwame Nkrumah in the Gold Coast prior to independence.

Early life and education
Jantuah was born on 21 December 1922 at Kejetia, a suburb of Kumasi, in the Ashanti Region of what was then the Gold Coast (present-day Ghana). He was baptised on 19 May 1934 and he was given the Christian names John and Ernest at the St. Peter's Catholic Church in Kumasi. In 1936, Jantuah went to St. Theresa's Junior Seminary at Amissano, near Elmina, for training. He attended St. Augustine's College from 1943 to 1944. He proceeded to the United Kingdom to study politics and economics at the University of Oxford (Plater College) on an Asanteman Council scholarship set up by the late Ashanti king (Asantehene), Otumfuo Sir Osei Tutu Agyeman Prempeh II. Jantuah entered the College of Law in 1964 and obtain his LLB and BL degrees in 1966. He was called to the Bar at Lincoln's Inn and later to the Ghana bar.

He was known formally as John Ernest Jantuah until 21 December 1962, when he changed his name to Kwame Sanaa-Poku Jantuah.

Career and politics 
Jantuah was a member of the Convention People's Party (CPP) served as a Agriculture minister and a cabinet minister in the Nkrumah government of the first republic. He also served as the Interior Minister during the Limann government. He served as the Acting High Commissioner to the United Kingdom in the 1950s, the first resident Ambassador to France and the Ambassador to the German Democratic Republic in the late 1980s during the PNDC era.  He was also the ambassador to Brazil during the Nkrumah era. He served as member of the CPP until his death.

Honours 
Jantuah was one of many Ghanaians to receive national awards on 6 July 2007 in Accra.

Personal life 
Kwame Sanaa-Poku Jantuah was the elder brother of Ghanaian politician, F. A. Jantuah. He died after a short illness in Accra on 3 February 2011, aged 88. He was a staunch Roman Catholic was buried on 26 March in his home town at Mampongteng in the Ashanti Region.

Publications 
Jantuah is the author of Death of an empire : Kwame Nkrumah in Ghana and Africa which was published posthumously in 2017.

Notes and references

See also 
 Limann government
F. A. Jantuah

External sources and links
Crusading Guide

1922 births
2011 deaths
Agriculture ministers of Ghana
Interior ministers of Ghana
Justice ministers of Ghana
People's National Party (Ghana) politicians
Convention People's Party (Ghana) politicians
Ambassadors of Ghana to East Germany
Ambassadors of Ghana to France
Ambassadors of Ghana to Brazil
High Commissioners of Ghana to the United Kingdom
People from Kumasi
Ashanti people
St. Augustine's College (Cape Coast) alumni